Double Wedding is a 2010 American television film directed by Craig Pryce and starring Tia Mowry and Tamera Mowry.

Plot
Danielle and Deanna Warren are twin sisters with different careers and personalities. The one thing they have in common is that they are looking for Mr. Right. Sure enough, the handsome Tate enters the picture and swoons both sisters, though he believes they're the same woman. At the same time, the twins have no idea that the man they're seeing is one and the same. So, when they invite him to meet the family on the same date, complications arise.

Cast
Tamera Mowry as Danielle Warren
Tia Mowry as Deanna Warren
O. T. Fagbenle as Tate
Chad Connell as Jasper Cooper
Jackie Richardson
Ardon Bess
Robin Brûlé
Sandra Caldwell as Holly
Tonya Lee Williams

Production
Filming occurred in Toronto.

Reception
Grace Montgomery of Common Sense Media awarded the film two stars out of five.

References

External links
 
 

2010 television films
2010 films
Lifetime (TV network) films
Films shot in Toronto
Films directed by Craig Pryce
2010s English-language films